To Catch a Spy is a 1971 comedy spy film directed by Dick Clement and starring Kirk Douglas, Marlène Jobert, Trevor Howard, Richard Pearson, Garfield Morgan, Angharad Rees and Robert Raglan. It was written by Clement and Ian La Frenais. The story is based on the 1969 novel Catch Me a Spy by George Marton and Tibor Méray.

It was a co-production between Britain, the United States and France, which was filmed in Bucharest, Romania. It was also part filmed on Loch Awe and Loch Etive, Scotland, where the gunboat scenes were filmed, and featured Kirk Douglas running through a herd of Highland cattle which were owned by David Fellowes. It was also released as Catch Me a Spy and Keep Your Fingers Crossed.

Plot
Fabienne, a young French-born British schoolteacher marries and heads to Bucharest in the Eastern Bloc for their honeymoon. Her husband is arrested by secret police and soon turns out to have been detained by Soviet intelligence as a spy. She intends to head to Moscow to try and help him, but instead is drugged and sent on a plane back to England by a seemingly suspicious waiter.

Back in London she lobbies her uncle, the shadow Shadow Foreign Secretary and his friend the head of British Intelligence, to help get her husband back. He explains that they have deliberately arrested her husband in order to have a bargaining chip to exchange for a top Soviet agent who has recently been unmasked by the British. Unbeknownst to Fabienne her husband, a corrupt businessman, is in league with the Soviet intelligence and has married her on their instructions. The exchange in Germany goes wrong, however, when during the handover the Soviet spy - laden down with capitalist consumer goods from the West - sinks through the ice and drowns.

As the British now have nobody to exchange for her husband, Fabienne sets out to capture an enemy agent on her own initiative. She manages to trap a man in a trench coat who has been following her all day, only for him to prove to be an incompetent British agent ordered to trail her for her own security by his chiefs. When Andrej the Bucharest waiter remerges, having been caught rummaging through her room and demanding she hand over a microfilm that he inserted into her luggage when he had her drugged in Bucharest, she decides he will be the ideal person to exchange. However, before she can take action they both end up being abducted by enemy agents, only escaping in the Scottish countryside. He reveals to her that he is not really a spy, but he makes money smuggling manuscripts of books by Soviet dissidents to the West.

Because the Soviets want to get their hands on him, they plant evidence in his hotel room indicating that he is one of their spies. Special Branch arrest him and agree to a new prisoner exchange, over Fabienne's protests. The final exchange on a lake on the East German border descends into chaos and a motor boat chase.

Cast
 Kirk Douglas as Andrej
 Marlène Jobert as Fabienne
 Trevor Howard as Sir Trevor Dawson
 Tom Courtenay as Baxter Clarke
 Patrick Mower as James Fenton
 Bernadette Lafont as Simone
 Bernard Blier as Webb
 Sacha Pitoëff as Stefan
 Richard Pearson as Haldane
 Wilfrid Brambell as Beech 
 Garfield Morgan as The Husband
 Angharad Rees as Victoria
 Isabel Dean as Celia
 Jonathan Cecil as British Attaché
 Robin Parkinson as British Officer
 Jean Gilpin as Ground Stewardess
 Robert Raglan as Ambassador
 Bridget Turner as Woman in Plane
 Trevor Peacock as Man in Plane
 Clive Cazes as Rumanian in Plane
 Ashley Knight as 1st Schoolboy
 Philip DaCosta as 2nd Schoolboy
 Robert Gillespie as Man in Elevator
 Sheila Steafel as Woman in lift
 Bunny May as Lift Operator
 Fiona Moore as Russian Girl
 Bernice Stegers as Russian Girl
 Dinny Powell as 1st Heavy
 Del Baker as 2nd Heavy
 Ishaq Bux as Arab at Party
 Cheryl Hall as Clarke's Girlfriend

Production
It was shot at Twickenham Studios and on location in London, Loch Leven and in Bucharest. The school football match was shot at Vincent Square. The film's sets were designed by the art director Carmen Dillon. It was made as a co-production between several companies including Kirk Douglas's own Bryna Productions.

The "gunboats" in the film were:-  Lalage, a 70 ft WW2 Fairmile harbor defense launch, the East German boat, and the Calshot Salar, a 60 ft WW2 Royal Air Force "three leg" pinnace, the British boat.

Lalage was owned and operated by Captain Jack Glover of Dumbarton, who in addition was an extra in the film, as was his brother Hans Glover. Tragically, Captain Glover drowned in 1982 while undertaking a boat salvage operation in the river Leven. Lalage eventually foundered off the Little Cubrae island after striking rocks during a severe storm and became a total loss.

Calshot Salar, was owned by Dr W."Bill" Souter and operated during filming by a Canadian, Captain Robin Blair-Crawford, who also had a position as an actor in the movie and in addition was the lead safety diver at Loch Etive. At the insistence of her owner Calshot Salar had her original RAF number painted on the hull for the movie. After numerous adventures in both home and overseas waters Calshot Salar was sold and eventually became a houseboat at Shoreham.

Critical reception
TV Guide wrote the film "features a good cast, an exciting
speedboat chase, a few chuckles, and every spy cliche in the book"; and Radio Times noted "a sometimes clever and witty script by the ace TV team of Dick Clement and Ian La Frenais. However, it's rather let down by Clement's uncertain direction. Another problem is that, as a Bucharest waiter who is actually a spy, Kirk Douglas's peculiar intensity isn't best suited to a comedy. Trevor Howard and Tom Courtenay seem more at home with the spy spoof material."

See also
 List of American films of 1971

References

Bibliography
 Simon James. London Film Location Guide. Anova Books, 2007.

External links

1971 films
1970s spy comedy films
American spy comedy films
British spy comedy films
Bryna Productions films
Cold War spy films
Films based on British novels
Films set in London
Films set in East Germany
Films set in West Germany
Films set in Scotland
Films set in Bucharest
Films shot in London
Films shot in Bucharest
Films shot in Scotland
Films shot at Twickenham Film Studios
French spy comedy films
English-language French films
Films with screenplays by Dick Clement
Films directed by Dick Clement
Films with screenplays by Ian La Frenais
1971 comedy films
Films scored by Claude Bolling
Films about educators
Films about vacationing
Films about marriage
1970s English-language films
1970s American films
1970s British films
1970s French films